Amukh (Dargwa: ГӀямух) is a rural locality (a selo) and the administrative centre of Amukhsky Selsoviet, Agulsky District, Republic of Dagestan, Russia. The population was 118 as of 2010.

Geography 
Amukh is located 21 km north of Tpig (the district's administrative centre) by road. Tsirkhe is the nearest rural locality.

References 

Rural localities in Agulsky District